Metalheads is a children's-animated television series set in the Middle Ages. The show centers around a group of children that attend the Metalhead Academy, a school for trainee Knights.

Characters
Sir Fuddleby 
Lester
Lady Liddy
Shmed
Bob
Drucilla
The God - who resemble a British King, also dressed in King's Outfit.
other more

Series 1 (2003-2004)
 "An Uncivil Suit"
 "The End of Time"
 "Watch Ye Birdie"
 "Dangling Dan's Day Off"
 "Closed Circuit Tapestry"
 "Olde soldiers Never Die, Alas"
 "Ye Kitchen Maids"
 "Besieged"
 "Send in the King"
 "My Life as a Page"
 "The Stick in the Stone"
 "Ye Sandwich of Destruction"
 "First Impressions"
 "The Not So Magic Kingdom"
 "A Kingdom For a Horse"
 "Last Hun Standing"
 "The King and the Pauper"
 "Metal Dads"
 "Knight of Disillusion"
 "The Schmed With the Golden Wand"
 "The Art of Courtly Love"
 "Sir Lester and the Green Knight"
 "Pygmalihon"
 "Lay on, MacGruff"
 "All or Nothingham"
 "None Shall Pass"

Awards and recognition
The series was a nominee in the 2004 British Academy Children's Awards for the Animation category.

Home Media 
A single DVD release of the series containing eight episodes was released in the United Kingdom by Metrodome Distribution in 2004. It also contains several bonus features, including two games, a quiz, character profiles, timelines and a Storyboard sequence.

References

External links
 

2003 British television series debuts
2004 British television series endings
2000s British children's television series
British children's animated fantasy television series
BBC children's television shows
English-language television shows
2000s British animated television series
Television series set in the Middle Ages
Fiction about God